Gabon Express was an airline based in Libreville, Gabon. It operated scheduled passenger services and passenger and cargo charters. It ceased operations in June 2004.

History
The airline was established in 1998 and started operations on 26 October 1998 between Libreville and Port-Gentil. The airline operated both Caravelle and HS 748 Aircraft. It grew to become the second largest airline in Gabon, operating 60 scheduled flights a week from Libreville. The airline's operations were suspended following the crash of one of its aircraft on 8 June 2004. Operations ceased on 15 June 2004.

At the time the airline ceased operations, it was the only airline still operating Caravelle aircraft in scheduled passenger services.

Accidents and incidents
 On June 8, 2004, a Gabon Express flight using a Hawker Siddeley HS 748 Series 2A, departed from Libreville for a scheduled passenger flight to Franceville. Engine problems forced the crew to turn back for Libreville but the aircraft crashed 100 m offshore. Of the 30 people on board, 19 of them were killed. The Gabonese government proposed legal action against the company and banned it from operating, claiming it had failed to insure its aircraft.

Fleet

Over the years, Gabon Express operated the following aircraft types:
 3 – Hawker Siddeley HS 748
 2 – Grumman Gulfstream I
 2 – Sud Aviation Caravelle
 1 – Fokker F27
 1 – NAMC YS-11

References

External links
 Gabon Express official website at the Internet Archive Wayback Machine

Defunct airlines of Gabon
Airlines established in 1998
Airlines disestablished in 2004
Companies based in Libreville
Gabonese companies established in 1998